The BT Sport Action Woman Awards are a series of monthly and yearly awards presented by BT Sport to the sports-woman or female sports team, usually British, who has been adjudged to have been the best of that month or year. The public vote for the winner from a list of nominations picked by BT Sport.

Action Woman of the Year 

The BT Sport Action Woman of the Year Award is decided based on a public vote, which features a list of ten nominations picked by BT Sport. Every nominee is backed by their own ambassador, whether it be from the world of sport or entertainment. The first winner of the award in 2013 was announced and presented with the award on The Clare Balding Show in January 2014. The 2014 award winner was announced and presented with it at the first BT Sport Action Woman of the Year Awards ceremony held at the BT Sport studios in December 2014. The same will happen in 2015.

Action Woman of the Month 

The BT Sport Action Woman of the Month Award is decided based on a public vote, which features a list of usually five nominations picked by BT Sport. Each winner is announced and presented with their award on The Clare Balding Show.

2014

2015

See also

 List of sports awards honoring women
 Sunday Times and Sky Sports Sportswomen of the Year Awards
 BBC Sports Personality of the Year
 BBC Scotland Sports Personality of the Year
 BBC Wales Sports Personality of the Year
 The Ian Wooldridge Award

References

External links 
BT Sport Action Woman BT Sport.
Action Woman BT Sport.

BT Sport
British sports trophies and awards
Sports awards honoring women
Awards established in 2013
2013 establishments in the United Kingdom
BT Sport